The 2015 Liga Dominicana de Fútbol season (known as the LDF Banco Popular for sponsorship reasons) is the 1st since its establishment.

Stadia and locations
Each team will play 18 matches in the regular season, the 4 teams with most points qualify to the playoffs. The champion will be decided in a single-legged final.

League table

Championship round

Semifinals

First leg

Second leg

Club Atlético Pantoja wins 4–2 on aggregate

2–2 on aggregate. Atlántico FC won on away goals.

Finals

Top goalscorers

Hat-tricks

Weekly awards

References

External links
FIFA
Liga Dominicana de Fútbol

Football in the Dominican Republic
Dominican Republic
Dominican Republic
2015 in Dominican Republic sport
Liga Dominicana de Fútbol seasons